Clent is a village and civil parish in the Bromsgrove District of Worcestershire, England, southwest of Birmingham and close to the edge of the West Midlands conurbation. At the 2001 census it had a population of 2,600.

Parish history

The parishes of Clent and Broome were once an exclave of Staffordshire, completely surrounded by Worcestershire, having been seized by the Sheriff of Staffordshire before the Norman Conquest. This anomaly was addressed in 1844 when it was belatedly returned to Worcestershire. Clent had, however, always remained part of the Worcester Diocese.

Geography
Because of the hilly topography of the parish the village consists of several distinct hamlets. These are Upper Clent (Clatterbach and the area around the parish church of St. Leonard), Lower Clent, Holy Cross, Adams Hill and Walton Pool.  
The Civil Parish of Clent also included part of the village of West Hagley, the population of which is about half that of the whole parish. On the first of April 2016, this part of the parish was transferred to the Parish of Hagley. Though in the ancient ecclesiastical parish of Clent, that area is now part of the Anglican parish of Broome.
Part of the parish is an area of agricultural lowland, but to the northwest the ground rises forming the Clent Hills (now owned by the National Trust), which is a popular destination for walkers.

Climate
Climate in this area has mild differences between highs and lows, and there is adequate rainfall year-round.  The Köppen Climate Classification subtype for this climate is "Cfb". (Marine West Coast Climate/Oceanic climate).

Education
Sunfield Children's Home is located in Clent, a charitable school for children with autism and complex learning needs. There is also a small primary school located in Holy Cross, called Clent Parochial Primary School, with just over 100 pupils ranging from Reception (age 4) to Year 6 (age 11), after
which the pupils feed into Haybridge High School, the local secondary school, in the neighbouring village of Hagley.

Notable residents
Notable residents of Clent include:
 John Amphlet, High Sheriff of Worcestershire in 1805
 Richard Fowler (5 March 1887 – 27 October 1970), cricketer 
 James Higgs-Walker (31 July 1892 – 3 September 1979), cricketer 
 Alan Todd (3 June 1900 – 14 August 1976), barrister and Conservative politician

References

Further reading
 Clent Parish Council
  – Although not published until much later, Erdeswicke's description of Clent was written during the 16th century. The layout is a little confusing because the text and the notes use a similar font, for example the text in the last paragraph on page 287 should be read together with the text in the last paragraph on page 288 as they are part of the same footnote ("... in 1421, by Joan Beauchamp, ... ").

External links 

photos of Clent and surrounding area on geograph

Villages in Worcestershire